A partial solar eclipse occurred on November 9, 1855 during spring. A solar eclipse occurs when the Moon passes between Earth and the Sun, thereby totally or partly obscuring the image of the Sun for a viewer on Earth. A partial solar eclipse occurs in the polar regions of the Earth when the center of the Moon's shadow misses the Earth. It was the eighth solar saros 150 cycle of eclipses

Description
The eclipse was visible in Tasmania and the southeasternmost areas of Australia, New Zealand and its surrounding islands such as Chatham and Cook and much of  Antarctica which most areas had a 24-hour daylight with the exception of the northernmost peninsular area (from the areas south of the Antarctic Circie) and its surrounding islands and the northernmost area at the 50th meridian east.  It included a tiny southeast area of the Indian Ocean, the southwesternmost of the Pacific and the tiny portion of the southernmost Atlantic.

The eclipse started at sunrise west of New Zealand and ended at sunset off the coast of Antarctica.  Areas that the eclipse ended slightly after or at sunrise included Sydney, Wollongong and Irvine in Australia. Areas that were in the rim of the eclipse included New Caledonia.

The greatest eclipse was in the Pacific Ocean hundreds of miles (or kilometers) north of Antarctica at 62.5 S & 121 E at 19:12 UTC (3:12 AM local time on November 10).

The eclipse showed 25% obscuration in the south of South Island, New Zealand and up to 48% at the area of the greatest eclipse.

The subsolar marking was in the Pacific Ocean around the Tropic of Capricorn.

See also 
 List of solar eclipses in the 19th century
 List of solar eclipses visible from Australia

References

External links 
 Google interactive maps
 Solar eclipse data

1855 11 9
Solar eclipse of 11 09
1855 in New Zealand
1855 11 9
November 1855 events